Sir Kenneth Kennedy O'Connor KBE MC QC (21 December 1896 – 13 January 1985, aged 88) was a soldier, lawyer and judge who served in the British Colonial Service.

Biography

Early life
O'Connor was born in Ranchi, Jharkhand, British India. He was the second child of the Revd. William O'Connor and Emma (née Kennedy). He was educated at Saint Columba's College, Dublin where he was a chorister and cricketer. From here he won a choral scholarship to Worcester College, Oxford but was unable to take it up due to the First World War.

India
In 1915, he joined the British Indian Army as an officer in the 14th King George's Own Ferozepore Sikhs. He was awarded the Military Cross "for distinguished and meritorious services" at the Battle of Sharqat, during the campaign in Mesopotamia against the Turks. Sir Kenneth later wrote a short account of the Battle of Sharqat. After the war he left the Indian Army with the rank of captain, though he was later made an honorary colonel. Having left the army, he joined the Foreign & Political Department of the Government of India, serving as the British District Commissioner in Charsadda, a district adjoining the Khyber Pass.

Legal career
In 1922, he left India and returned to England, where he was called to the London Bar in 1924 by Gray's Inn. After a short time practising at the London Bar, he became a partner in the firm of Drew & Napier in Singapore. In Singapore, he met and married Margaret Helen Wise, the eldest daughter of the rubber planter Percy Furlong Wise, of the Devonshire dynasty. As Chairman of the Straits Settlements Association, O'Connor played a key role in planning the civilian evacuation of the island in the event of a Japanese invasion. He escaped from Singapore in a small, open sailing boat with unsuitable sails and a children's atlas for navigation. Despite these impediments, with three others, he successfully sailed to Sumatra. O'Connor later wrote a short account of this adventure, entitled Four Men in a Boat. He had already evacuated his young family (Anthony, born 1933 and Hugh, born 1940) to Australia, where he later joined them.

Colonial Legal Service
In 1943, having joined the Colonial Legal Service, O'Connor was appointed Attorney General of Nyasaland. After the war he returned to Singapore to reconstruct the legal practice of Drew & Napier. In 1946, he was appointed Attorney General of the Malayan Union and in 1948, Attorney General of Kenya. In 1951, O'Connor was appointed Chief Justice of Jamaica in which position he served until 1954. He was knighted in 1952.

In 1954, he was recalled to Kenya as Chief Justice, serving until 1957. During his time as Chief Justice of Kenya, the Mau Mau Uprising was at its peak. O'Connor was the senior presiding judge in many Mau Mau trials, the most notable being that of Dedan Kimathi, whom O'Connor sentenced to death in 1957. O'Connor finished his legal career as President of the Court of Appeal for Eastern Africa from 1957 to 1962, with jurisdiction over Kenya, Uganda and Tanganyika.

Later life
Following independence, Sir Kenneth and Lady O'Connor retired to their house, Buckland Court, in Surrey, England in 1962. Sir Kenneth died on 13 January 1985, aged 88.

References

1896 births
1985 deaths
People educated at St Columba's College, Dublin
Members of Gray's Inn
Colonial Legal Service officers
Indian Political Service officers
British Indian Army officers
Indian Army personnel of World War I
Recipients of the Military Cross
Military personnel of British India
British people of the Mau Mau Uprising
Colony of Jamaica judges
Chief justices of Jamaica
Chief justices of Kenya
British Kenya judges
Uganda Protectorate judges
Tanganyika (territory) judges
Attorneys General of British Kenya
Nyasaland people
Attorneys-General of Nyasaland
British colonial attorneys general in Asia
East African Court of Appeal judges
Knights Bachelor
Knights Commander of the Order of the British Empire
20th-century Jamaican judges